John Devereaux Dubricious Pember (8 June 1940 – 25 January 2007) was an English cricketer who played first-class cricket from 1968 to 1971.

He was born in Creaton, Northamptonshire, and attended Wellingborough School, where he played in the first eleven. A club cricketer and landowner in Northamptonshire, he joined Leicestershire and made his first-class debut in 1968 at the age of 28. He appeared intermittently for the county over the next three years, playing 24 first-class matches and 10 one-day matches as a left-handed batsman who bowled right-arm fast-medium.

His highest score was 53, batting at number 11 against Northamptonshire in 1970, and his best bowling figures were 5 for 45 (followed by 2 for 45 in the second innings) in an innings victory over Somerset in 1968.

References

External links
 John Pember at CricketArchive
 

1940 births
2007 deaths
People educated at Wellingborough School
English cricketers
Leicestershire cricketers